Robert John Landsee (born March 21, 1963) is a former American football player and coach. He was also the head coach and owner of the Milwaukee Mustangs of the Arena Football League (AFL) till the team folded. He is a former American football center and guard who played for two seasons in the National Football League (NFL). He played for the Philadelphia Eagles from 1986–1987. He was drafted by the Eagles in the sixth round of the 1986 NFL Draft. He played college football at Wisconsin.

Playing career
Landsee earned All-State honors in both football and basketball at Iron Mountain High School. Before his graduation in 1985, he had also earned All-American and All-Big Ten honors during his career at Wisconsin.

Landsee was drafted by the Philadelphia Eagles in the sixth round of the 1986 NFL Draft. He played for two seasons with the Eagles, from 1986 to 1987.

Coaching career

Milwaukee Mustangs
Landsee was the offensive line coach for the Milwaukee Mustangs of the Arena Football League (AFL) from 1999–2001.

Toronto Phantoms and Indiana Firebirds
Landsee was a coach for the Toronto Phantoms in 2002 and for the Indiana Firebirds in 2003.

Green Bay Blizzard
Landsee was the head coach for the Green Bay Blizzard of the AF2 from 2005–2006 and from 2008–2009. He finished his career with the Blizzard with a record of 45–28 including playoffs. In 2006, Landsee coached the Blizzard to an East Division and American Conference Championship. He also brought his team to ArenaCup VII where they lost to the Spokane Shock 57–34. In 2008, the Blizzard had their best regular season record in franchose history, going 11–5 and earning the Midwest Division Championship. Under Landsee, 27 players signed contracts with fully professional teams, such as the AFL, the NFL or the Canadian Football League.

Milwaukee Iron
Landsee was named head coach of the Milwaukee Iron of the AFL on October 13, 2009.

Jacksonville Sharks
Landsee had been serving as the line coach of the Jacksonville Sharks of the AFL when he was named the interim head coach of the team after former head coach Les Moss was fired with two games to go in the 2016 season.

AFL head coaching record

Personal
Landsee is the president of the Madison, Wisconsin chapter of the National Football League Alumni.

References

External links
 Milwaukee Iron bio
 NFL Alumni Madison Chapter website

1963 births
Living people
People from Iron Mountain, Michigan
Players of American football from Michigan
American football centers
American football offensive guards
Wisconsin Badgers football players
Philadelphia Eagles players
Milwaukee Mustangs (1994–2001) coaches
Toronto Phantoms coaches
Jacksonville Sharks coaches
Indiana Firebirds coaches
Green Bay Blizzard coaches
Milwaukee Mustangs (2009–12) coaches